Daşbulaq is a village and municipality in the Shamkir Rayon of Azerbaijan.  It has a population of 591 and sits on a ridgetop in the foothills of the Lesser Caucasus. 
It is sometimes known as Dağ İrmaşlı as there is a strong family connection between the village and the small town of İrmaşlı on the plains below, though at present the only roads between the two are unpaved and unsuitable for city cars. There is a small, recently semi-restored Caucasian-Albanian church ruin on the lip of the ridge surveying a wide panorama to the north.

The Church Ruin

As with many ancient ruins in the Caucasus, the history of the ancient church ruins is disputed. In 2016, Russia-born Azerbaijani translator and historian Afgan Khalili (Əfqan Xəlilli) published an overview of the existing scholarship on the site which, to locals the site is known as İrmaşli Piri, i.e. a holy site rather than a church per se. He interrogates the Armenian sources of Samvel Karapetyan who photographed the ruins in 1985 and recorded the name in Armenian as Huskan Natahak Vank, based on Armenian-language newspaper stories of the 1880s. However, at the time that Karapetyan visited, many Armenians lived in nearby Bado and none reported any memory of the site being a church during recent history. Many ancient inscription stones are dotted around the site, or reset into walls but in a fashion that suggests that their location is a part of a somewhat haphazard restoration. Videos posted in 2019 suggest that part of the roof has collapsed threatening the interior with further damage.

References 

Populated places in Shamkir District